The 87th Assembly District of Wisconsin is one of 99 districts in the Wisconsin State Assembly.  Located in northwest Wisconsin, the district comprises all of Rusk and Taylor counties and most of Sawyer County, as well as parts of northwest Marathon County.  It includes the cities of Hayward, Ladysmith, and Medford, and contains the Lac Courte Oreilles Indian reservation.  The district is represented by Republican James W. Edming, since January 2015.

The 87th Assembly District is located within Wisconsin's 29th Senate district, along with the 85th and 86th Assembly districts.

List of past representatives

References 

Wisconsin State Assembly districts
Clark County, Wisconsin
Marathon County, Wisconsin
Sawyer County, Wisconsin
Rusk County, Wisconsin
Taylor County, Wisconsin